W47CK (channel 47) is a defunct low-power television station licensed to Shallotte, North Carolina, United States, which served the Wilmington area as an affiliate of MyNetworkTV. Owned by Timothy McIver, the station maintained a transmitter on Royal Oak Road in Lockwoods Folly Township, northwest of Supply.

Background
W47CK used the fictional callsign "WMYW" in its branding, which was unrecognized by the Federal Communications Commission (FCC). It was one of two television stations in Wilmington which continued to operate analog signals after the market's voluntary digital switchover on September 8, 2008, and continued to broadcast in the same format since the June 12, 2009 national transition date.

W47CK did not apply for digital facilities nor to perform a "flash-cut" to digital with the FCC. Low-power television stations like W47CK were not initially required to switch to digital in the United States though two other low-power outlets (then-CBS affiliate and now independent station WILM-LD and former Trinity Broadcasting Network station W51CW) did make an early switch in Wilmington on the voluntary date. Low-power television stations had to convert to digital on or before July 13, 2021.

For a period of time, WITN-DT2 from Washington, North Carolina could be seen on Time Warner Cable digital channel 931 in the greater Wilmington area since W47CK was technically ineligible for mandatory carriage on cable providers due to its low-power status. As a result, the clearance allowed WITN-DT2 to unofficially serve as Wilmington's MyNetworkTV outlet since, at that time, the network had no affiliate in the area. Eventually, Time Warner Cable (now Spectrum) would pick up W47CK on its digital tier and subsequently dropped WITN-DT2 from the lineup.

On December 11, 2020, the FCC canceled W47CK's license for failing to submit a license renewal application.

References

47CK
Television channels and stations established in 1999
1999 establishments in North Carolina
Television channels and stations disestablished in 2020
2020 disestablishments in North Carolina
Defunct television stations in the United States
47CK